Eastown is a 70 square block district that is a part of Grand Rapids, Michigan. It has been described by some as the Greenwich Village of Grand Rapids. It is considered by many in the Grand Rapids area as somewhat of a liberal oasis in a rather conservative area.

Today a walkable mixed-use neighborhood, Eastown began as a streetcar commuter suburb of downtown Grand Rapids. Eastown has an active community association, business association and neighborhood newsletter called the Access.

Eastown is primarily white, but also has a large and tight-knit African-American population.

Places of interest
There are several places of business that are part of Eastown. These include Wolfgang's, Yesterdog, The New Yorker Mens Wear, Mulligan's Pub, Billy's, Smitty's Liquor store, Eastown Cafe, Fruition Açai & Juice Bar, Matchbox, Early Bird, Pita House, Spirit Dreams, Bombay Cuisine, The Society of Healing Arts Institute (SOHAI), Kitten Flower Boutique, Danzon Cubano, Redux Used Books, Taproot Pictures, Argos Books, E. A. Brady's Butcher Shop, GoJo Ethiopian Cuisine, The Stephen J Group, Eastown Sports Bar, McKendree Jewelers, Terra GR, Chez Olga, Harmony Brewing Company, Geno's Pizza, GR Bagel, and Vertical Media Solutions.

Wilcox Park, a large park in  Eastown, is commonly used for various outdoor activities which include kite-flying, kickball, and tennis. Coldbrook Creek divides the park from Aquinas College.

Location

The neighborhood is bounded on the north by Fulton Street, on the east by the city border with East Grand Rapids, on the south by Franklin Street, and on the west by Fuller Avenue. The neighborhood is centered on the intersection of Wealthy Street and Lake Drive.

2008 explosion
On February 26, 2008, a 140-year-old building exploded due to a gas leak, injuring seven people.  Residents throughout the neighborhood felt shock waves.  The building collapsed into rubble, sending 20-foot flames into the air and destroying all the local businesses housed within.

External links
 Eastown Area Business Association
 Eastown Community Association
 Yesterdog
Eastown Walking Tour from Calvin University

References

Neighborhoods in Grand Rapids, Michigan